Joe Warlick Bratcher, Sr. (July 22, 1898 – October 13, 1977), nicknamed "Goobers", was an outfielder in Major League Baseball. He played for the St. Louis Cardinals in 1924.

References

External links

1898 births
1977 deaths
Major League Baseball outfielders
St. Louis Cardinals players
Minor league baseball managers
Baseball players from Texas
People from Grand Saline, Texas